A statue of William III, also known as the Prince of Orange statue, stands in Brixham, Devon, England. It commemorates the landing of William of Orange (later to become King William III of England) and his army at the town on 5 November 1688. The monument has been a Grade II listed building since 1949.

Description 
The monument consists of a white marble statue on a granite pedestal and plinth. The statue is a figure of William Prince of Orange. On the south-west face of the pedestal (facing away from the harbour) the incised inscription reads:On the south-east face the inscription reads: On the north-west face is the inscription: The statue was originally surrounded by a set of iron railings, but these no longer exist.

References

External links 
 

Brixham
Grade II listed buildings in Devon
William III, Brixham
Statues of William III of England